There for Tomorrow is the debut studio album by American alternative rock band There for Tomorrow. It was released on April 30, 2004, on WPrecords. The band made a release party on the same day, selling the cd for $10.  This album features James Flaherty on guitar, backing vocals before he left the band in 2005. Before the release, the band showcase short demos of "I Won't Die" and "Your Mistake". Because of this, the two tracks could be one of the first tracks ever made for the album since the band sounded different and were showcase while the band were still called "The Kick Off".

Track listing

Development 
The album was made when the band were 15-17 years old. They signed to Wolfgramm Productions in 2003 after many live performances of the band that caught the label's eyes. The album had been worked on since 2003 and on the band's and Wolfgramm Productions' website (which both are dead) they showcase early demos of the songs.  After finally being done in the final stages of being manufactured, the band made a release party on the same day, celebrating the hard work of the band and thanking the fans for helping out, they sold the cd for $10.

Aftermath 
This is the only album that features James Flaherty before his sudden departure in 2005. When the band was asked about his disappearance, this was their reply, "To clear things up, we have parted ways with our guitarist, James Flaherty for undisclosed reasons, but there are no hard feelings." Because of this, Maika has decided to step down from the position of lead singer, which will allow him to focus more on his guitar work (which Maika changed his mind of stepping down as lead singer later on). With that said, There For Tomorrow is in search of a back vocalist and a guitarist, which in 2006 they found Christian Climer to take his place. Years after the release of Point Of Origin, the band gave little recognition to the existence of this album and mostly forgot about it.

Personnel
Maika Maile – lead vocals, guitar, programming
James Flaherty  - guitar, backing vocals
Jay Enriquez – bass, backing vocals
Christopher Kamrada – drums, samples

References

External links
 Point of Origin on Myspace
 

2004 debut albums
There for Tomorrow albums